McKessock is a surname. Notable people with the surname include:

Bob McKessock (born 1933), Canadian politician

See also
McKissock